Edward John Cooke (born 18 March 1942) is an English former football goalkeeper who was a member of non-league Macclesfield Town's highly successful team of the late 1960s and early 1970s. He previously played in the Football League for Port Vale, and later represented Altrincham, Chorley and Morecambe.

Career
Cooke passed through the Port Vale youth team to sign professional forms under manager Norman Low in June 1960. He was only ever utilized as an emergency keeper when Ken Hancock was injured, and after just seven Third Division appearances in almost four years he was given a free transfer away from Vale Park in May 1964 by manager Freddie Steele.

He was taken to Macclesfield Town by manager Albert Leake, a former half-back at Port Vale. He held his place in the reserves before he made the first team goalkeeping position his own from the 1965–66 season. From then on Macclesfield went on to win the Cheshire County League in 1967–68, the Northern Premier League in 1968–69 and 1969–70; and also lifted the FA Trophy at Wembley in 1970, the Cheshire Senior Cup in 1969, and the Cheshire League Challenge Cup in 1967. Cooke was also the goalkeeper for Macclesfield's Third Round FA Cup tie with Bobby Robson's Fulham at Craven Cottage on 27 January 1968.

He later played for Altrincham, Chorley and Morecambe, and after retiring he ran a plastering and construction business before becoming contracts manager for Shimizu Europe Limited.

Career statistics
Source:

Honours
Macclesfield Town
Cheshire League Challenge Cup: 1967
Cheshire County League: 1967–68
Northern Premier League: 1968–69 and 1969–70
Cheshire Senior Cup: 1969
FA Trophy: 1970

References

1942 births
Living people
Footballers from Barnsley
English footballers
Association football goalkeepers
Port Vale F.C. players
Macclesfield Town F.C. players
Altrincham F.C. players
Chorley F.C. players
Morecambe F.C. players
English Football League players
Northern Premier League players